"Mera Me Ti Mera" (Greek: Μέρα με τη μέρα) is a single released by Antique. It reached #45 on the Swedish singles chart.

Track listing
 "Mera Me Ti Mera" (Radio Version) - 3:13
 "Mera Me Ti Mera" (Extended Version) - 5:08

Charts

References

2000 singles
Antique (band) songs
Greek-language songs
1999 songs
Songs written by Christer Sandelin